John Korir is the name of:

 John Cheruiyot Korir (born 1981), Kenyan runner, mostly cross-country and track races
 John Korir Kipsang (born 1975), Kenyan runner, mostly competes at road races in the US
 John Korir (runner, born 1996), Kenyan runner, finished 3rd at the 2022 Chicago Marathon